Brigitte Catillon (born 20 July 1951) is a French actress and screenwriter. She was nominated for the César Award for Best Supporting Actress in 1993 for A Heart in Winter directed by Claude Sautet. She was also nominated for the Molière Award for actress in a supporting role in 2007 for the play EVA of Nicolas Bedos, and in 2011 for the play Nono of Sacha Guitry, directed by Michel Fau.

Selected filmography

References

External links 
 

1951 births
Living people
French stage actresses
French film actresses
20th-century French actresses
21st-century French actresses
French television actresses
French women screenwriters
French screenwriters